Aníbal Ramón Ruffner (20 July 1959 – 25 September 2022) was a Peruvian engineer and politician.

Ruffner died on 25 September 2022, at the age of 63.

References

1959 births
2022 deaths
Peruvian engineers
Peruvian politicians
People from Lima Region